Mark Zachary Jacobson (born 1965) is a professor of civil and environmental engineering at Stanford University and director of its Atmosphere/Energy Program. He is also a co-founder of the non-profit, Solutions Project.

Jacobson's career has focused on "better understanding air pollution and global warming problems and developing large-scale clean, renewable energy solutions to them". To that end, he has developed computer models to study the effects of fossil fuels, biofuels, and biomass burning on air pollution, weather, and climate.

One major use of these models has been to examine the impacts of black and brown carbon particles from human-caused combustion on health and climate. He has concluded that such particles may be the second-leading cause of global warming after carbon dioxide. Due to their short time in the air and their strong health impacts, he has also hypothesized that controlling their emissions may be the fastest method of slowing global warming and will also improve people's health.

In 2009 Jacobson and Mark Delucchi published a paper in Scientific American proposing that the world should move to 100% clean, renewable energy, namely wind, water, and solar power, across all energy sectors. He has traveled extensively granting interviews, promoting and discussing  "the development of technical and economic plans to convert the energy infrastructure of each of the 50 United States, 143 countries, and dozens of cities to those powered with 100% wind, water, and sunlight (WWS) for all purposes".

Jacobson's 2015 "Stanford University study" on transitioning the 50 states to WWS was cited in House Resolution 540 (2015) as the scientific basis for the first proposed legislation in the United States for the country to move to "100% clean renewable energy." "Many of the assumptions in the Green New Deal appear to be based on his scholarship." Proposed legislation for states to go to 100% renewable energy also originate from Jacobson's work. For example, 2015 New York Senate Bill S5527 states, “This bill builds upon the Jacobson wind, water and solar (WWS) study by Stanford and Cornell professors”.

Jacobson has built his own net-zero home to run on renewable energy.

Jacobson's clean, renewable energy solutions exclude nuclear power, carbon capture, and bioenergy. This has resulted in pushback by some advocates and scientists who support these technologies He has published responses to these critics. In addition, at least 17 other independent research groups support his results that energy can be supplied with renewables around the world. In addition, over 60 countries now have laws or commitments to move to 100% renewable electricity.

Research

Jacobson has published research on the role of black carbon and other aerosol chemical components on global and regional climates.

Jacobson advocates a speedy transition to 100% renewable energy in order to limit climate change, air pollution damage, and energy security issues. Jacobson co-founded the non-profit Solutions Project in 2011 along with Marco Krapels, Mark Ruffalo, and Josh Fox. The Solutions Project was started to combine science, business, and culture in an effort to educate the public and policymakers about the ability U.S. states and communities to switch to a "100% renewable world".

Soot and aerosol

Jacobson, as a PhD student at UCLA under Richard P. Turco, began computer model development in 1990 with the development of algorithms for what is now called GATOR-GCMOM (Gas, Aerosol, Transport, Radiation, General Circulation, Mesoscale, and Ocean Model). This model simulates air pollution, weather, and climate from the local to global scale. Zhang (2008, pp. 2901, 2902) calls Jacobson's model "the first fully-coupled online model in the history that accounts for all major feedbacks among major atmospheric processes based on first principles."

Several of the individual computer code solvers Jacobson developed for GATOR-GCMOM include the gas and aqueous chemistry ordinary differential equations solvers SMVGEAR and SMVGEAR II, alongside a slew of other related and different modules, The GATOR-GCMOM model has incorporated these processes and has evolved over several decades.

One of the most important fields of research that Jacobson has added to, with the aid of GATOR-GCMOM, is re-defining the range of values on exactly how much diffuse tropospheric black carbon from fossil fuel, biofuel, and biomass burning affects the climate. Unlike greenhouse gases, black carbon absorbs solar radiation. It then converts the solar energy to heat, which is re-emitted to the atmosphere. Without such absorption, much of the sunlight would potentially reflect back out to space since it would have struck a more reflective surface. Therefore, as a whole, soot affects the planets albedo, a unit of reflectance. On the other hand, greenhouse gases warm the atmosphere by trapping thermal-infrared heat radiation that is emitted by the surface of the Earth.

Jacobson found that, as soot particles in the air age, they grow larger due to condensation by gases and collision/coalescence with other particles. He further found that when a soot particle obtained such a coating, more sunlight enters the particles, bounces around, and eventually gets absorbed by the black carbon. On a global scale, this may result in twice the heating by black carbon as uncoated particles. Upon detailed calculations, he concluded that black carbon may be the second-leading cause of global warming in terms of radiative forcing. Jacobson further found that soot from diesel engines, coal-fired power plants and burning wood is a "major cause of the rapid melting of the Arctic's sea ice.

Jacobson's refinement to the warming impacts of soot and his conclusion that black carbon may be the second leading cause of global warming in terms of radiative forcing was affirmed in the comprehensive review of Bond et al. (2013).  For this body of work, he received the Henry G. Houghton Award from the American Meteorological Society in 2005 and the American Geophysical Union Ascent Award in 2013.

Jacobson has also independently modeled and corroborated the work of World Health Organization researchers, who likewise estimate that soot/particulate matter produced from the burning of fossil fuels and biofuels may cause over 1.5 million premature deaths each year from diseases such as respiratory illness, heart disease and asthma. These deaths occur mostly in the developing world where wood, animal dung, kerosene, and coal are used for cooking.

Because of the short atmospheric lifetime of black carbon, in 2002 Jacobson concluded that controlling soot is the fastest way to begin to control global warming and that it will likewise improve human health. However, he cautioned that controlling carbon dioxide, the leading cause of global warming, was imperative for stopping warming.

100% renewable energy

Jacobson has published papers about transitioning to 100% renewable energy systems, including the grid integration of renewable energy. He has concluded that wind, water, and solar (WWS) power can be scaled up in cost-effective ways to fulfill world energy demands in all energy sectors, In 2009 Jacobson and Mark A. Delucchi published "A Plan to Power 100 Percent of the Planet with Renewables" in Scientific American. The article addressed several issues related to transitioning to 100% WWS, such as the energy required in a 100% electric world, the worldwide spatial footprint of wind farms, the availability of scarce materials needed to manufacture new systems and the ability to produce reliable energy on demand. Jacobson has updated and expanded this 2009 paper as the years progress, including a two-part article in the journal Energy Policy in 2010. Jacobson and his colleague estimated that 3.8 million wind turbines of 5-Megawatt (MW) size, 49,000 300-MW concentrated solar power plants, 40,000 300-MW solar PV power plants, 1.7 billion 3-kW rooftop PV systems, 5350 100-MW geothermal power plants, and some 270 new 1300-MW hydroelectric power plants would be needed. All of which would require approximately 1% of the world's land to be achieved.

Jacobson and his colleagues then published papers on transitioning three states to 100% renewable/WWS energy by 2050. In 2015, Jacobson was the lead author of two peer reviewed papers, one of which examined the feasibility of transitioning each of the 50 United States to a 100% energy system, powered exclusively by wind, water and sunlight (WWS), and the other that provided one proposed method to solve the grid reliability problem with high shares of intermittent sources. In 2016 the editorial board of PNAS selected the grid integration study of Jacobson and his co-workers as best paper in the category "Applied Biological, Agricultural, and Environmental Sciences" and awarded him a Cozzarelli Prize.

Jacobson has also published papers to transition 139 and 143 countries as well as 54 towns and cities and 74 metropolitan areas to 100% WWS renewable energy for all purposes. For his work on solving large-scale air pollution and climate problems, Jacobson was awarded the Judi Friedman Lifetime Achievement award in 2018.

Jacobson is co-founder of the non-profit The Solutions Project along with Marco Krapels, Mark Ruffalo, and Josh Fox. This organization "helps to educate the public about science-based 100% renewable energy transition roadmaps and facility a transition to a 100% renewable world".

Opinion on energy systems 
 
Like his PhD advisor Richard P. Turco, who notably coined the phrase "nuclear winter", Jacobson has taken a similar approach to calculating the hypothetical effects of nuclear wars on the climate but has further extended this into providing an analysis that intends to inform policy makers on which energy sources to support, as of 2009. Jacobson's analyses suggest that "nuclear power results in up to 25 times more carbon emissions per unit energy than wind energy".

This analysis is controversial. Jacobson arrived at this conclusion of "25 times more carbon emissions than wind, per unit of energy generated" (68–180.1 g/kWh), by specifically expanding on some concepts that are highly contested. These include, though are not limited to, the suggestion that emissions associated with civil nuclear energy should, in the upper limit, include the risk of carbon emissions associated with the burning of cities resulting from a nuclear war aided by the expansion of nuclear energy and weapons to countries previously without them. An assumption that Jacobson's debating opponent similarly raised, during the Ted talk Does the world need nuclear energy?  in 2010, with Jacobson heading the debate in the negative. Jacobson assumes, at the high end (180.1 g/kWh), that 4.1 g/kWh are due to some form of nuclear induced burning that will occur once every 30 years. At the low end, 0 g/kWh are due to nuclear induced burning. Responding to a commentary on his work in the Journal Environmental Science and Technology in 2013, James Hansen has characterized Jacobson's analysis on this topic of greenhouse gas emissions, as "lack(ing) credibility" and similarly regards Jacobson's other viewpoint of extra "opportunity-cost" emissions as "dubious". With the foundation of Hansen's incredulity being based on French experience, that decarbonized ~80% of the grid in 15 years, completed 56 reactors in the 15-year period, thus raising the fact that depending on the existence of established regulator certainty & political conditions, nuclear energy facilities have been accelerated through the licensing/planning phase and have therefore rapidly decarbonizated electric grids.

The Intergovernmental Panel on Climate Change(IPCC) regard Yale University's Warner and Heath's methodology, used to determine the Life-cycle greenhouse-gas emissions of energy sources, as the most credible, reporting that the conceivable range of total-life-cycle nuclear power emission figures, are between 4-110 g/kWh, with the specific median value of 12 g/kWh, being deemed the strongest supported and 11 g/kWh for Wind. While Jacobson's limited lifecycle figures, of 9-70 g/kWh, falls within this IPCC range. The IPCC however, does not factor in Jacobson's "opportunity cost" emissions on any energy source. The IPCC has not provided a detailed explanation for not including Jacobson's "opportunity costs". Aside from the time required for planning, financing, permitting, and constructing a power plant, for every energy source that can be analyzed, the time required and therefore Jacobson's "opportunity costs" also depends on political factors, for example hypothetical legal cases that can stall construction and other issues that can arise from site specific NIMBYISM. It is the delay/opportunity cost  of emissions that are the bulk of the difference between Jacobson's overall emissions for nuclear of 68–180.1 g/kWh and the IPCC's lifecycle emissions.

Decarbonization assessments 
Jacobson's 100% renewable world approach is supported by publications among at least 17 international research groups that find 100% renewables possible at low cost throughout the world. It is also supported by the Global 100RE Strategy Group, a coalition of 47 scientists supporting 100% renewable energy to solve the climate problem. His work is also consistent with results from a study out of  the U.S. National Renewable Energy Laboratory (NREL), which found that a 100% clean, renewable U.S. electricity grid with no combustion turbines might cost ~4.8 ¢/kWh to keep the grid stable. This is less than the cost of electricity from a new natural gas plant. His work is further supported by a 2016 publication by Mark Cooper, who has previously evaluated the economics of nuclear energy at the Vermont Law School, In 2016 Cooper published, a comparison of the 100% WWS roadmaps of Jacobson with deep decarbonization proposals that included nuclear power and fossil fuels with carbon capture. Cooper concluded that the 100% WWS pathway was the least cost and “Neither fossil fuels with CCS or nuclear power enters the least-cost, low-carbon portfolio.” Earlier publications, from 2011 to 2015, that analyzed, with different methodologies, various strategies to get to a global zero or low carbon economy, by circa 2050, reported that a renewables-alone approach, would be "orders of magnitude" more expensive and more difficult to achieve than other energy paths that have been assessed. The more recent studies, including the NREL study, dispute these claims.

Opinions on nuclear energy 

Jacobson argues that if the United States wants to reduce global warming, air pollution and energy instability, it should invest only in the best energy options, and that nuclear power is not one of them. To support his claim, Jacobson provided an analysis in 2009 that intended to inform policy makers on which energy sources are best for solving the air pollution, climate, and energy security problems the world faces. He updated this analysis in his 2020 textbook. Jacobson's analyses suggest that "nuclear power results in up to 25 times more carbon emissions per unit energy than wind energy".

That analysis accounted for some emission sources not included in previous analyses, The primary emissions due to nuclear energy are called “opportunity-cost emissions.” These are the emissions from the background grid due to the long time lag between planning and operation of a nuclear plant (10 to 19 years) versus a wind or solar farm (2 to 5 years), for example. Of the total estimated emissions from nuclear in the 2009 study (68–180.1 g/kWh), 59–106 g/kWh was due to opportunity-cost emissions. Most of the rest (9-70 g/kWh) was due to lifecycle emissions, and a small amount (0-4.1 g/kWh) was due to the risk of carbon emissions associated with the burning of cities resulting from a nuclear war aided by the expansion of nuclear energy to countries previously without them, and the subsequent development of weapons in those countries. Jacobson raised this last assumption during a Ted talk Does the world need nuclear energy? in 2010, with Jacobson heading the debate in the negative.

The Intergovernmental Panel on Climate Change (IPCC) reported a range of total-life-cycle nuclear power emissions as between 4-110 g/kWh[54]  Jacobson's lifecycle emission figures of 9-70 g/kWh fall within this IPCC range. The IPCC however, did not account for "opportunity cost" emissions. The IPCC did not provide any explanation for not including such emissions. Although nuclear advocates have balked at the idea of including even a small risk of emissions, even at the high end, from a potential nuclear war arising from the spread of nuclear energy, the IPCC has stated that,

"Barriers to and risks associated with an increasing use of nuclear energy include operational risks and the associated safety concerns, uranium mining risks, financial and regulatory risks, unresolved waste management issues, nuclear weapons proliferation concerns, and adverse public opinion.”

In 2012, Jacobson coauthored a paper estimating the health effects of the Fukushima nuclear disaster. The paper projected approximately 180 "cancer-related morbidities" to eventually occur in the public. Health physicist Kathryn Higley of Oregon State University wrote in 2012, "The methods of the study were solid, and the estimates were reasonable, although there is still uncertainty around them. But given how much cancer already exists in the world, it would be very difficult to prove that anyone’s cancer was caused by the incident at Fukushima Daiichi." Burton Richter, tenured in Stanford with Jacobson, who analyzed the use of the disputed Linear no-Threshold (LNT) model in the paper, similarly stated in his critique, "It is a first rate job and uses sources of radioactivity measurements that have not been used before to get a very good picture of the geographic distribution of radiation, a very good idea". Richter also noted that "I also think there is too much editorializing about accident potential at Diablo Canyon which makes [Jacobson's] paper sound a bit like an anti-nuclear piece instead of the very good analysis that it is," and "It seems clear that considering only the electricity generated by the Fukushima plant, nuclear is much less damaging to health than coal and somewhat better  gas even after including the accident. If nuclear power had never been deployed in Japan the effects on the public would have [been] much worse."

Critiques of 100% renewable papers
Jacobson's renewable energy solutions exclude nuclear power, carbon capture, and bioenergy. This has resulted in pushback by some scientists. 21 researchers published a critique in 2017 of Jacobson's "100% Renewable" paper of the United States. Jacobson and his coauthors published a response to the critical paper and also requested the journal and authors to either correct "false factual claims" of modeling error or retract the article. After both declined, Jacobson filed a lawsuit against the Proceedings of the National Academy of Sciences and Christopher Clack as the principal author of the paper for defamation. Jacobson dismissed his lawsuit without prejudice in 2018 because "It became clear…that it is possible that there could be no end to this case for years."

Publications

Books 
 Jacobson, M. Z., Fundamentals of Atmospheric Modeling. Cambridge University Press, New York, 656 pp., 1999.
 Jacobson, M. Z., Fundamentals of Atmospheric Modeling, Second Edition, Cambridge University Press, New York, 813 pp., 2005.
 Jacobson, M. Z., Atmospheric Pollution: History, Science, and Regulation, Cambridge University Press, New York, 399 pp., 2002.
 Jacobson, M. Z., Air Pollution and Global Warming: History, Science, and Solutions, Cambridge University Press, New York, 2011.
 Jacobson, M.Z., 100% Clean, Renewable Energy and Storage for Everything, Cambridge University Press, New York, 427 pp., 2020.

Selected articles

See also
 Amory Lovins
 Benjamin K. Sovacool
 Kick The Fossil Fuel Habit
 Mark Diesendorf
 Nuclear power debate
 Renewable energy commercialization
 Renewable energy debate
 Stephen Thomas
 Vaclav Smil

References

External links
 Precourt Institute for Energy
 
 
 "Debate: Does the world need nuclear energy?" (TED2010)

1965 births
20th-century American engineers
20th-century American writers
21st-century American engineers
21st-century American writers
Environmental engineers
Living people
Energy engineers
Stanford University School of Engineering faculty
American environmentalists